The national flag of Colombia symbolises Colombian independence from Spain, gained on 20 July 1810. It is a horizontal tricolor of yellow, blue and red. The yellow stripe takes up a half of the flag and the blue and red take up a quarter of the space each.

Symbolism and design

The horizontal stripes (from top to bottom) of yellow, blue and red tricolor have a ratio of 2:1:1. It—together with that of Ecuador, also derived from the flag of Gran Colombia—is different from most other tricolor flags, either vertical or horizontal, in having stripes which are not equal in size. (Venezuela, whose flag is also derived from the same source, opted for a more conventional tricolor with equal stripes).

The official colors have not yet been established by law. The Colombian Olympic Committee approved the following colors for the London 2012 Summer Olympics:

According to the current interpretation, the colors represent:

 
 
 

The flag's colors have other representations, such as blue for loyalty and vigilance, red for the victory of battles for Colombian independence, and yellow for sovereignty and justice.

History 
Francisco de Miranda originally created the common yellow, blue, and red flag of Gran Colombia that Colombia, Ecuador and Venezuela, with slight variations, share today. Miranda gave at least two sources of inspiration for his flag. In a letter written to Count Simon Romanovich Woronzoff  and philosopher Johann Wolfgang von Goethe, Miranda described a late-night conversation he had had with Goethe at a party in Weimar during the winter of 1785. Fascinated by Miranda's account of his exploits in the United States Revolutionary War and his travels throughout the Americas and Europe, Goethe told him, "Your destiny is to create in your land a place where primary colors are not distorted.” He proceeded to clarify what he meant:

After Miranda designed his flag based on this conversation, he recalled seeing a fresco by Lazzaro Tavarone in the Palazzo Belimbau in Genoa that depicted Christopher Columbus unfurling a similar-colored flag in Veragua during his fourth voyage.

In his military diary, Miranda gave another possible source of inspiration: the yellow, blue and red standard of the Burger Guard (Bürgerwache) of Hamburg, which he also saw during his travels in Germany.

In the 1801 plan for an army to liberate Spanish America, which he submitted unsuccessfully to the British cabinet, Miranda requested the materials for "ten flags, whose colors shall be red, yellow, and blue, in three zones." However, the first flag was not raised until 12 March 1806, in Jacmel, Haiti, during his ill-fated expedition to Venezuela.

Gallery of flags
National flag

Historical flags

Military and civil flags

Historical military and civil flags

Construction sheets

Gallery of images

See also

 List of Colombian flags
 Coat of arms of Colombia
 ¡Oh, Gloria inmarcesible!

References

External links

Colombian flag history (Spanish)
Colombian flag history (English) 

Joaquín Piñeros Corpas, "Historia de la bandera colombiana" (1967) 183pp.

 
Colombia
National symbols of Colombia
Colombia